Poromyidae is a family of saltwater clams, marine bivalve molluscs in the order Anomalodesmata. The genus Dilemma, described in 2008, is remarkable for being a predator of copepods, which is very unusual for a sessile mollusc.

Genera and species
Genera and species within the family Poromyidae include:

Cetomya Dall, 1889
Dermatomya Dall, 1889
Dermatomya buttoni Dall, 1916
 Dermatomya mactroides (Dall, 1889)
 Dilemma Leal, 2008
Lissomya Krylova, 1997
 Poromya Forbes, 1844
 Poromya albida Dall, 1886
 Poromya beringiana (Dall, 1916)
 Poromya elongata Dall, 1886
 Poromya granulata (Nyst and Westendorp, 1839)
 Poromya houbricki Bernard, 1989
 Poromya laevis E. A. Smith, 1885
 Poromya leonina (Dall, 1916)
 Poromya malespinae (Ridewood, 1903)
 Poromya neaeroides Sequenza, 1876
 Poromya neozelanica (Dell, 1956)
 Poromya rostrata Rehder, 1943
 Poromya tenuiconcha (Dall, 1913)
 Poromya tornata (Jeffreys, 1876)
 Poromya trosti Strong and Hertlein, 1937

References

 Sasaki T. & Leal J. H. (2008). "Dilemma japonicum new species (Bivalvia: Anomalodesmata: Poromyidae): A new record of the genus from the Northwest Pacific". The Nautilus 122: 166-170. PDF fulltext
 Powell A. W. B. (1979). New Zealand Mollusca. William Collins Publishers Ltd, Auckland, New Zealand. 

 
Bivalve families